Mayr's swiftlet (Aerodramus orientalis) is a species of swift in the family Apodidae.
It is found in New Ireland and Guadalcanal.

References

Mayr's swiftlet
Birds of New Ireland Province
Guadalcanal
Mayr's swiftlet
Taxonomy articles created by Polbot